Agathodes designalis, the sky-pointing moth, is a moth in the family Crambidae. It was described by Achille Guenée in 1854. It lives in Arizona, Texas, Florida, southern South America and the West Indies.

The length of the forewings is 13-18.5 mm. They are marbled purple and green. The hindwings are beige. Adults are on wing from May to September in four generations in Florida.

The larvae feed on Erythrina (including Erythrina flabelliformis), Inga and Citharexylum species. The summer and fall generations feed on the leaves of their host plant, while larvae of the spring generation feed on the flowers. Young larvae are translucent and orange. Older larvae have an orange body with cream stripes and a bright red head.

Subspecies
Agathodes designalis designalis
Agathodes designalis monstralis Guenée, 1854 (Mexico, West Indies)

References

Moths described in 1854
Spilomelinae
Moths of North America
Moths of South America